The Straumsund Bridge is a bridge that crosses Straumsundet between the mainland and Aspøya in Møre og Romsdal county in Norway. The bridge is 412 metres long, and the longest span is 146 metres.

The Straumsund Bridge was opened in 1991. It is part of Krifast, the town of Kristiansund's road connection to the mainland.

See also
List of bridges in Norway
Bergsøysund Bridge
Gjemnessund Bridge

Bridges in Møre og Romsdal
Bridges completed in 1991
1991 establishments in Norway
European route E39 in Norway
Norwegian National Road 70
Road bridges in Norway